A Murgia motion is a common motion in California criminal law based on the California Supreme Court decision Murgia v. Municipal Court (1975) 15 Cal.3d 286. The motion is made to request that the defendant's criminal charges be dismissed upon a showing of selective prosecution for improper purposes, amounting to a violation of right to equal protection of law.

References 

California law